Carrie Rodriguez Live in Louisville is the third album released by Carrie Rodriguez. Live in Louisville was recorded at the Brown Theatre in Louisville, Kentucky.

Track listing

Personnel 
 Carrie Rodriguez - Vocals, mandobird, fiddle
 Hans Holzen        - Backing vocals, electric Guitar
 Kyle Kegerreis - Backing vocals, acoustic Bass 
 Sam Baker - Drums

Recorded and mixed live by Kevin Madigan at W.L. Lyons Brown Theatre in Louisville, Kentucky

References

Carrie Rodriguez on Ninth Street Opus

2009 live albums
Carrie Rodriguez albums
Albums recorded at Brown Theatre